RTR Vehicles is an American automotive company founded in 2009 by Vaughn Gittin Jr. involved in designing, developing, and manufacturing OEM+ performance vehicle packages for Ford’s product line. RTR stands for “Ready to Rock!”

Ford Mustang RTR 
Ford Mustang RTR is a dealer installed OEM+ performance vehicle package for the Ford Mustang. It is a blend of American muscle and European inspired styling available in three Spec packages. All Spec package components have been track-proven and validated by professional Ford test drivers and Formula Drift Champion Vaughn Gittin Jr. Individual RTR parts are also available through dealers and vendors.

G4 S550 Mustang RTR (2018 - current model years)

Series 1 Mustang RTR Powered by Ford Performance 

Hitting the streets in 2019 RTR Vehicles worked with Ford Performance to provide a definitive collaboration of style, performance and fun with the new Series 1 Mustang RTR Powered by Ford Performance. The Mustang features RTR's signature modern and aggressive styling combined with Ford Performance's adjustable sway bars for either passive or MagneRide suspensions. The Series 1 package is designed to be dealer installed on any Mustang EcoBoost Performance Package 1 or Mustang GT Performance Package 1 model.  Ford will sell only 500 of the serialized Series 1 Mustang RTR Powered by Ford Performance.

Standard w/ every Mustang RTR Series 1 Powered by Ford Performance:
RTR Upper Grille with LED Lights
RTR Lower Grille
RTR Rear Spoiler Gurney Flap
RTR : Powered By Ford Performance Decklid Panel
RTR Fender Badges
RTR Floor Mats
RTR Shift Knob (on manual options)
RTR Series 1 Graphics
Ford Performance Suspension System
Ford Performance Strut Brace
RTR Serialized Dash Plaque designating the build number in the line of 500 units
RTR Powered By Ford Performance Serialized lighted sill plate
RTR side mirror puddle lamps
Ford Performance RTR 19 staggered wheels - 19x9.5 and 19x10

RTR Design Package

The Ford Mustang RTR Design Package is RTR Vehicles' entry level model that utilizes their Modern Aggressive Styling and industry-leading, OEM quality body parts. The Design Package is specifically designed with style in mind. Each part has been engineered to improve the overall look and functionality of the already superior Ford Mustang. The Design Package is perfect for the enthusiast that wants the RTR styling, but also wants a platform to expand upon. All Design Package components have been track-proven and validated by professional Ford test drivers and Formula Drift Champion Vaughn Gittin, Jr.

Mustang RTR Design Package: Compatible with any Mustang GT or Ecoboost trim level.  Entry level vehicle non-serialized

Standard w/ every Mustang RTR Design Package:
RTR Upper Grille with LED Lights
RTR Lower Grille
RTR Rear Spoiler (gurney flap or RTR decklid)
RTR Fender Badges
RTR Dash Plaque signed by Vaughn Gittin Jr
RTR Tech 5 or Tech Mesh Wheels (Matte Charcoal Finish)19x9.5 square setup

Available Upgrades:
20” Wheel Upgrade
RTR Leather Package
RTR non-active exhaust (only available in 2020 models)

Spec 1 

RTR Spec 1 package combines modern aggressive styling and industry leading, OEM+ quality body parts with performance suspension parts. The Spec 1 is specifically designed with style in mind. Each part has been engineered to improve the overall look and functionality of the already superior Mustang. 

Spec 1: Compatible with any trim level Mustang GT or Ecoboost.

Standard w/ every Mustang RTR Spec 1:
RTR Upper Grille with LED Lights
RTR Lower Grille
RTR Hood Extractor Vents
RTR Rear Spoiler
RTR Decklid Panel
RTR Fender Badges
RTR Floor Mats
RTR Shift Knob (on manual options)
RTR Graphics
RTR Tactical Performance Lowering Springs
RTR Serialized Dash Plaque signed by Vaughn Gittin Jr
RTR 19" Tech 7 Wheels (Matte Charcoal Finish) w/ Nitto NT555 G2 Ultra High-Performance Tires.

Available Upgrades:
MagneRide upgrade: (RTR springs replaced with FP GT350 springs)
20” Tech 7 Upgrade
20" Aero 7 Upgrade
RTR Leather Package
RTR non-active exhaust (2018-2020)

Spec 2 

In addition to the added appearance parts of the Spec 1, the Spec 2 kit allows for the continued customization of the vehicle through the adjustable suspension components, allowing RTR owners complete control of their Mustang's handling and performance.

Spec 2: Compatible with any Performance Pack 1 or 2, Ecoboost or GT

Standard w/ every Mustang RTR Spec 2:
RTR Upper Grille with LED Lights
RTR Lower Grille
RTR Front Chin Spoiler
RTR Bumper Inserts and Turning Vanes
RTR Hood Extractor Vents
RTR Rear Diffuser
RTR Rear Spoiler
RTR Decklid Panel
RTR Rocker Splitters
RTR Rear Quarter Splitters
RTR Fender Badges
RTR Floor Mats
RTR Shift Knob (on manual applications)
RTR Graphics
RTR Tactical Performance Lowering Springs
RTR Tactical Performance Front & Rear Sway Bars
RTR Tactical Performance Adjustable Shock/Strut
RTR Serialized Dash Plaque signed by Vaughn Gittin Jr
RTR 20" Tech 7 Wheels (Matte Charcoal Finish) w/ Nitto NT555 G2 Ultra High-Performance Tires (275/35R20).

Available Upgrades:
MagneRide(RTR springs, shocks and struts removed, FP GT350 springs added)
20" Aero 7 upgrade
RTR Leather Package
RTR non-active exhaust (2018-2020)

Spec 3 

The Spec 3 brings all the styling and performance of the Spec 2, but with an all new supercharger kit for the V8-powered Mustang GT.

Spec 3: Compatible with Performance Pack 1 or 2 GT Mustang

Standard w/ every RTR Spec 3:
Ford Performance Supercharger Kit (Produces 700 horsepower/610 lb-ft of torque)
RTR Upper Grille with LED Lights
RTR Lower Grille
RTR Front Chin Spoiler
RTR Bumper Inserts and Turning Vanes
RTR Hood Extractor Vents
RTR Rear Diffuser
RTR Rear Spoiler
RTR Decklid Panel
RTR Rocker Splitters
RTR Rear Quarter Splitters
RTR Fender Badges
RTR Floor Mats
RTR Shift Knob
RTR Graphics
RTR Tactical Performance Lowering Springs
RTR Tactical Performance Front & Rear Sway Bars
RTR Tactical Performance Adjustable Shock/Strut
RTR Serialized Dash Plaque signed by Vaughn Gittin Jr
RTR 20" Tech 7 Wheels (Matte Charcoal Finish) w/ Nitto NT555 G2 Ultra High-Performance Tires (275/35R20).
 
Mustang RTR Spec 3 Available Upgrades:
Performance Pack Spoiler Lip Option (Available for Performance Pack Cars Only)
RTR Street Spec Axle-Back Exhaust (Non-Active)(2018-2020)
MagneRide equipped (RTR springs, shocks and struts removed, FP GT350 springs added)
RTR Leather Package

Mustang RTR Spec 5 10th Anniversary Edition (2020-2021)

The Mustang RTR Spec 5 10th Anniversary Edition was released in 2020 to commemorate the 10 year anniversary of RTR Vehicles.  It was a great way to honor the history and lineage of the RTR brand and was capped off with Vaughn Gittin Jr winning his second Formula Drift Championship, 10 yrs after his first. The Spec 5 10th Anniversary features RTR Vehicles' Spec 5 widebody kit much like the one utilized in Vaughn Gittin JR's Spec 5-D Formula Drift pro car.  Also carried over from the Spec 5-D are the front canards and rear aero plains.  Each car is also re-sprayed in Ford's Lead Foot Gray, which was not available on the Mustang.  Each owner also has the option of 5 accent colors to add to the exterior trim and graphics package as well as the interior.

At this time, 8 cars currently reside in the US and 2 went abroad to New Zealand. 3 US units are built in accent Hyper Lime, 1 US unit built in accent Grabber Blue, and an Omaze giveaway car built in accent Space White.  The New Zealand vehicles were built in Hyper Lime and Orange Fury accent.  The other 3 units are not know at this time.
 
Spec 5 10th Anniversary Edition limited to 10 units world wide

Ford Performance Phase 2 Supercharger Kit (Produces 750 horsepower/670 lb-ft of torque)
Upgraded Drive train components including axle half shafts
RTR Tactical Performance Coilovers
Spec 5 widebody Flares
Full Leadfoot Grey Exterior paint respray
RTR 10th Anniversary Interior/Exterior accent color
Choose from Hyper Lime, Orange Fury, Grabber Blue, Race Red, Space White
RTR Upper Grille with LED Lights
RTR Lower Grille
RTR Front Chin Spoiler
RTR Bumper Inserts and Turning Vanes
RTR Hood Extractor Vents
RTR Rear Diffuser
RTR Rear Spoiler
RTR Decklid Panel
RTR Rocker Splitters
RTR Rear Quarter Splitters
RTR Fender Badges
RTR Floor Mats
RTR Shift Knob
RTR Graphics– 10th anniversary limited Edition
RTR Tactical Performance Front & Rear Sway Bars
RTR 10th Anniversary Serialized Dash Plaque signed by Vaughn Gittin Jr
RTR Aero 7 Forged 20x9.5 -10 offset and 20x11 -16 offset Wheels wrapped in 285/30R20 and 305/30R20 Nitto NT555 G2 Rubber

G3 S550 Mustang (2015 - 2017 model years)

Spec 1 

Debuted in Fall of 2014, the Mustang RTR Spec 1 was said to be "one of the most aggressive-looking ’Stangs the market has to offer" by TopSpeed.com.  The redesign of the 2015 S550 Ford Mustang brought many changes, all of which RTR Vehicles was able to capitalize on with enhanced performance and aggressive track inspired styling.

The Mustang RTR Spec 1 hit the market first and was focused on styling. The RTR Spec 1 was compatible with any trim level Mustang GT, Ecoboost, or V6.

Standard w/ every Mustang RTR Spec 1:

RTR Upper Grille with LED Lights
RTR Lower Grille
RTR Front Chin Spoiler
RTR Rear Diffuser
RTR Rear Spoiler
RTR Decklid Panel (Large Vinyl Logo)
RTR Rocker Splitters
RTR Rear Quarter Splitters
RTR Fender Badges
RTR Floor Mats
RTR Shift Knob (on manual applications)
RTR Tactical Performance Lowering Springs - 1"
RTR Graphics
RTR Serialized Dash Plaque signed by Vaughn Gittin Jr
RTR 19" Tech 7 Wheels (Matte Charcoal Finish) w/ Nitto NT555 G2 Ultra High-Performance Tires (275/40R19)

Spec 2 

Released in early 2017, the Mustang RTR Spec 2 was a hit for RTR Vehicles.  Featured in numerous publications from Muscle Mustang, Performance Auto and Sound, Autoweek, and The Smoking Tire to name a few.  The Mustang RTR Spec 2 had the perfect balance of RTR's aggressive styling and track capable handling.

Spec 2: Compatible with any trim level Mustang GT, Ecoboost, and V6

Standard w/ every Mustang RTR Spec 2:

RTR Upper Grille with LED Lights
RTR Lower Grille
RTR Front Chin Spoiler
RTR Rear Diffuser
RTR Rear Spoiler
RTR Decklid Panel (Large Vinyl Logo)
RTR Rocker Splitters
RTR Rear Quarter Splitters
RTR Fender Badges
RTR Floor Mats
RTR Shift Knob (on manual applications)
RTR Graphics
RTR Tactical Performance Lowering Springs
RTR Tactical Performance Front & Rear Sway Bars
RTR Tactical Performance Adjustable Shock/Strut
RTR Axle Back Exhaust by Magnaflow
Ford Performance Power Pack 1
K&N Drop-in Filter
RTR Serialized Dash Plaque signed by Vaughn Gittin Jr
RTR 20" Tech 7 Wheels (Matte Charcoal Finish) w/ Nitto NT555 G2 Ultra High-Performance Tires (275/35R20)

Spec 3

Released in mid 2017, the Mustang RTR Spec 3 was spawned from the Spec 2 with supercharger option ideation.  RTR Vehicles altered their original offerings knowing that there was a spot for the supercharged beast all on its own. 

Spec 3: Compatible with any trim level Mustang GT

Standard w/ every Mustang RTR Spec 3:

Ford Performance supercharger 700hp/640tq
RTR Upper Grille with LED Lights
RTR Lower Grille
RTR Front Chin Spoiler
RTR Rear Diffuser
RTR Rear Spoiler
RTR Decklid Panel (Large Vinyl Logo)
RTR Rocker Splitters
RTR Rear Quarter Splitters
RTR Fender Badges
RTR Floor Mats
RTR Shift Knob (on manual applications)
RTR Graphics
RTR Tactical Performance Lowering Springs
RTR Tactical Performance Front & Rear Sway Bars
RTR Tactical Performance Adjustable Shock/Strut
RTR Axle Back Exhaust by Magnaflow
RTR Serialized Dash Plaque signed by Vaughn Gittin Jr
RTR 20" Tech 7 Wheels (Matte Charcoal Finish) w/ Nitto NT555 G2 Ultra High-Performance Tires (275/35R20)

G2 S197 (2013-2014)

Spec 1 

Altered for the 2013-14 model, the Mustang RTR was split into 2 distinctive packages.  The Mustang RTR Spec 1 and Spec 2 were created to offer the purchaser a choice of style or enhanced performance with style.

The Mustang RTR Spec 1 was developed with RTR Vehicles aggressive styling in mind.  Designed as an appearance package, the Mustang RTR Spec 1 was your entry into the world of the Ready to Rock mentality.

Spec 1: Compatible with any trim level Mustang GT or V6

Standard w/ every Mustang RTR Spec 1:
RTR Front Chin
RTR Rear Spoiler
RTR License plate Surround with ducts
RTR Fender badges
RTR Rear decklid applique
RTR Signature Graphics Package
RTR Shift Knob
RTR Embroidered Floor Mats
RTR interior badges
RTR Serialized Dash Plate signed by Vaughn Gittin Jr.
RTR 19×9.5 wheels with black lug nuts (matte charcoal or silver)
Falken FK-452 Ultra High Performance Tires 
RTR Axleback Exhaust System
Ford Racing 1″ lowering springs

Spec 2 

Released for the first time in 2013, the Mustang RTR Spec 2 was the ultimate balance of appearance and track inspired handling for the Ford Mustang.

Spec 2: Compatible with any trim level Mustang GT or V6

Standard w/ every Mustang RTR Spec 2:
RTR Front Chin
RTR Rear Spoiler
RTR 3 Piece Rear Diffuser
RTR Rocker splitters
RTR License plate Surround with ducts
RTR Fender badges
RTR Rear decklid applique
RTR Signature Graphics Package
RTR Shift Knob
RTR Embroidered Floor Mats
RTR interior badges
RTR Serialized Dash Plate signed by Vaughn Gittin Jr.
RTR 19×9.5 wheels with black lug nuts (matte charcoal or silver)
Falken FK-452 Ultra High Performance Tires 
Ford Racing Performance Calibration
K&N Air filter
RTR Axleback Exhaust System
Ford Racing 1″ lowering springs
RTR Tactical Performance adjustable shocks and struts
Ford Racing upper Shock Mount
RTR Adjustable Front and Rear sway bars
RTR Adjustable Panhard Bar
RTR Rear chassis support
Cross Drilled and slotted rotors

G1 S197 (2010-2012) 

"Pro drifter Vaughn Gittin, Jr., campaigns a highly modified Mustang GT in drift competitions, and is quite successful in the Formula Drift series. At [the 2009] SEMA show, Ford and Gittin unveiled a modified Mustang that fans could buy from Ford dealerships. The Mustang RTR has been updated and is now based on the model-year 2011 Mustang GT with its 5.0-liter V-8."
(CarandDriver.com 06/11/10 - Jake Holmes)

"Vaughn Gittin Jr. wowed us with his RTR-C Ford Mustang. With a full carbon fiber body, supercharged V8 producing 550 horsepower and a custom interior, it was easily one of the coolest modern pony cars we had ever seen." "[T]he Mustang RTR, [is] a much cheaper version of the RTR-C that's actually fairly affordable for the average sports car buyer." (Autoblog.com 10/12/11 - Drew Phillips)

Mustang RTR is compatible with any trim level Mustang GT or V6

Standard w/ every Mustang RTR:

RTR Graphics Package
RTR Exterior Badging
RTR Interior Badging
RTR Serialized Dash Plaque signed by Vaughn Gittin Jr
RTR Shift Knob (manual applications)
RTR Floor Mats
RTR 19x9.5 Dark Matte Charcoal Wheels
Falken FK-452 High Performance Tires
Lug nuts
RTR Front Chin Assembly with Splitter & Support by Classic Design Concepts
RTR Side Rocker Splitters by Classic Design Concepts
RTR Aluminum Spoiler by Classic Design Concepts
RTR Rear Diffuser by Classic Design Concepts
Ford Performance Shocks, Struts, and Lowering Springs
Ford Performance Axle Back Exhaust
Ford Performance Tune with Calibration Tool
K&N High Flow Air Filter
Baer Cross Drilled and Slotted Rotors

G1 Ford Ranger RTR (2019-current)

The Ford Ranger RTR blends RTR Vehicles' signature RTR styling with industry leading performance parts. The Ford Ranger RTR is designed with style and functionality in mind. Each part was engineered to enhance the overall look and performance of the Ford Ranger. All Ford Ranger RTR components have been validated by Ultra4 off-road racer and East Coast Champion, Vaughn Gittin Jr as well as factory Ford test drivers. 

Ranger RTR: Compatible with any trim level 4X4 Ford Ranger

Standard w/ every Ranger RTR:
RTR Upper Grille with LED Lights
RTR Fender Flares
RTR 17” Tech 6 Wheels (Stain Charcoal) w/ 265/70R17 Nitto Ridge Grappler Tires
Fox 2.0 Performance Coilovers
Ford Performance Cat-Back Exhaust
RTR License Plate Frame
RTR Dealer Graphics Package
RTR Dealer Fender Vents w/ Badging
RTR Floor Liners
RTR Serialized Dash Plaque signed by Vaughn Gittin Jr
Black Performance Lug Nuts and TPMS

Ranger RTR Available Upgrades:
RTR Leather Package
RTR Grille w/ LED Light Bar

G1 Ford F-150 RTR (2018-2020) 

The Ford F-150 RTR is a dealer installed OEM+ performance vehicle package for the Ford F-150 with individual parts available for purchase. Each F-150 RTR package comes with the signature RTR upper grille with LED lighting, fender flares, 20-inch Tech 6 amongst other upgrades. The F-150 RTR started out as a muscle truck concept generating buzz before being offered to the public in the first quarter of 2019.

F-150 RTR: Compatible with any trim level (except Raptor) 2.7, 3.5, or 5.0 4X4 Super Crew Cab - RTR F150 grille not compatible with 360 front facing camera option.

Standard w/ every F-150 RTR:
RTR Upper Grille w/ LED Lighting
RTR Fender Flares
RTR Front Skid Plate in Satin Black (in silver on #001 - #020)
RTR Dealer Graphics Package
RTR Dealer Fender Badges
RTR Dealer Serialized Dash Plaque Signed by Vaughn Gittin Jr.
RTR Floor Liners
Ford Performance Cat-Back Exhaust
Fox 2.0 Coilover / Shock package w/ Fox Roost Shields
RTR 20” Tech 6 Offroad Wheels (Satin Charcoal) w/ 295/55R20 Nitto Ridge Grappler Tires
Black Performance Lug Nuts and TPMS

Optional Equipment:
Ford Performance Supercharger
RTR Leather Package

Ford F-150 RTR Muscle Truck Concept 

The Ford F-150 RTR Muscle Truck Concept is a multi-purpose machine capable of performing the wide range of tasks all F-150's can handle. Rather than being purpose built for one thing like off-roading or track performance, the muscle truck can do a little of everything.

The 2018 Ford F-150 RTR Muscle Truck Concept exterior mods include RTR's signature grille and lighting package, fender flares, RTR badging, and forged RTR Tech 6 off-road wheels wrapped in 33-inch Nitto Ridge Grappler tires. It has a custom RTR interior by automotive leather interior specialist Katzkin and a dash plaque signed by Vaughn Gittin Jr. The 2018 Ford F-150 RTR Muscle Truck Concept pickup is packing over 600 hp courtesy of a modified 5.0-liter V-8 with a supercharger.

In popular culture

The Grand Tour 

The 2018 Ford Mustang RTR Spec 3 was shown on season 3, episode 1 of The Grand Tour. Co-host Jeremy Clarkson drove the Spec 3 against co-host Richard Hammond in the Dodge Challenger Demon, and co-host James May in the Hennessey Camaro ZL1 “Exorcist” in a series of challenges. The Spec 3 recording the best time on their makeshift race track and being declared the car Richard Hammond would buy of the three with his own money.

External links

Muscle cars
Ford Mustang